The 1960 Scottish League Cup final was played on 29 October 1960 at Hampden Park in Glasgow, and was the final of the 15th Scottish League Cup competition. The final was contested by Rangers and Kilmarnock. Rangers won the match 2–0, thanks to goals by Ralph Brand and Alex Scott.

Match details

External links
 Soccerbase

1960
League Cup Final
Scottish League Cup Final 1960
Scottish League Cup Final 1960
1960s in Glasgow
October 1960 sports events in the United Kingdom